Hylettus griseofasciatus is a species of longhorn beetles of the subfamily Lamiinae. It was described by Audinet-Serville in 1835, and is known from southeastern Brazil.

References

Beetles described in 1835
Endemic fauna of Brazil
Hylettus